Pow! may refer to:

 Pow!, an onomatopoeia for a sudden, hard blow, first used in action comics
Pow! (album), 1967 album by Sonny Stitt
Pow! (comics), a 1960s British comic
POW! Entertainment, an American media production company
 Pow! (novel), a 2012 novel by Mo Yan

See also
 POW (disambiguation)